Ammar :

 Ammar (name), given name of Arabic origin. Meaning “The Creator”

Given names
 Ammar Abdulhamid, Syrian writer
 Ammar Campa-Najjar, American politician
 Ammar bin Humaid Al Nuaimi, Crown Prince of the Emirate of Ajman 
 Ammar al-Qurabi, Syrian human rights activist
 Ammar ibn Yasir, one of the companions of the Islamic prophet Muhammad

Surname 

 Al-Hasan ibn Ammar, Arab commander and statesman for the Fatimid Caliphate.
 Michael Ammar, American magician
 Muhammad ibn Ammar, Muwallad poet from Silves
 Rachid Ammar, chief of staff of the Tunisian Armed Forces

See also 
 Amar (disambiguation)
 Amr (name)
 Omar (name)